The Lioré-et-Olivier LeO H-6 and LeO H-6/2 were French flying boat and amphibian aircraft, built shortly after World War I.

Design
The LeO H-6 was a biplane flying boat with a monocoque fuselage. The second example, the LeO H-6/2, with similar powerplant, was completed as an amphibian.

Variants
LeO H-6 the first aircraft a flying boat transport.
LeO H-6/2 The generally similar amphibious version.

Specifications (LeO H-6)

References

1910s French civil aircraft
6
Trimotors
Aircraft first flown in 1919
Flying boats
Amphibious aircraft